The Embassy of Croatia in Moscow is the diplomatic mission of Croatia in the Russian Federation. It is located at 16 Korobeynikov Lane in the Khamovniki District of Moscow.

See also 
 Croatia–Russia relations
 List of diplomatic missions in Russia

References

External links 

  Embassy of Croatia in Moscow

Croatia–Russia relations
Croatia
Moscow
Khamovniki District
Government agencies established in 1992